Caddidae is a family of harvestmen arachnids with 15 known species, the only family of the Eupnoi superfamily Caddoidea.

They have mostly a body length between one and three millimeters.

Distribution
Caddids are widely but discontinuously distributed. In the subfamily Caddinae, Caddella is endemic to southern South Africa, while Caddo is found in eastern North America and Japan with the Kuril Islands. In the other subfamily, Acropsopilioninae, Hesperopilio occurs in western Australia and Chile, Acropsopilio is found in Japan, eastern North America, Central to South America, eastern Australia and New Zealand. Austropsopilio is found in eastern Australia, Tasmania and Chile. This complex pattern suggests that separation occurred in several steps: during the Neogene (eastern North America and Japan); at the beginning or before the Tertiary (South America and Australia), and during the time of Gondwana (Africa and Australia).

Name
The family name is derived from "Caddo", a North American indigenous culture, people and language.

Species

 Caddinae Banks, 1892
 Caddella Hirst, 1925 (South Africa)
 Caddella africana (Lawrence, 1931)
 Caddella capensis Hirst, 1925
 Caddella croeseri Starega, 1988
 Caddella spatulipilis Lawrence, 1934
 Caddella spatulipilis Lawrence, 1934
 Caddella caledonica Lawrence, 1934
 Caddo Banks, 1892 (eastern North America, Japan)
 Caddo agilis Banks, 1892 (New York)
 Caddo pepperella Shear, 1974
 † Caddo dentipalpis (Koch & Berendt) (fossil)
 Caddo glaucopis Crosby, 1904 (New York)

 Acropsopilioninae Roewer, 1923
 Hesperopilio Shear, 1996 (Western Australia, Chile)
 Hesperopilio mainae Shear, 1996

 Acropsopilio Silvestri, 1904 (Japan, eastern North America, Central to South America, eastern Australia, Chile)
 Acropsopilio chilensis Silvestri, 1904 (Chile, Tierra del Fuego)
 Acropsopilio boopsis (Crosby, 1904) (New York)
 Acropsopilio chomulae (Goodnight & Goodnight, 1948) (Mexico)
 Acropsopilio neozealandiae (Forster, 1948) (New Zealand)
 Acropsopilio australicus Cantrell, 1980 (Queensland)
 Acropsopilio normae Cekalovic, 1974
 Acropsopilio venezuelensis González-Sponga, 1992 (Venezuela)

 Austropsopilio Forster, 1955 (eastern Australia, Tasmania, Chile)
 Austropsopilio altus Cantrell, 1980 (New South Wales)
 Austropsopilio inermis Cantrell, 1980 (New South Wales)
 Austropsopilio cygneus Hickman, 1957
 Austropsopilio novahollandiae Forster, 1955

 Tasmanopilio Hickman, 1957 (Tasmania)
 Tasmanopilio fuscus Hickman, 1957
 Tasmanopilio megalops Hickman, 1957

Footnotes

References
 's Biology Catalog: Caddidae
  (eds.) (2007): Harvestmen - The Biology of Opiliones. Harvard University Press 

Harvestman families
Taxa named by Nathan Banks